Birsk (Börö; , Böre) is a town in the Republic of Bashkortostan, Russia, located on the right bank of the Belaya River,  from Ufa, the capital of the republic. Population:

History
Birsk was founded in 1663 and granted town status in 1781. From 1865 to 1919 it was part of Ufa Governorate.

Administrative and municipal status
Within the framework of administrative divisions, Birsk serves as the administrative center of Birsky District, even though it is not a part of it. As an administrative division, it is, together with two rural localities, incorporated separately as the town of republic significance of Birsk—an administrative unit with the status equal to that of the districts. As a municipal division, the town of republic significance of Birsk is incorporated within Birsky Municipal District as Birsk Urban Settlement.

Demographics
Ethnic composition:
Russians: 57%
Tatars: 19.2%
Bashkirs: 10.9%
Mari: 10.7%

References

Notes

Sources

External links
Official website of Birsk 
Birsk Business Directory 
Official website of Birsk State Social-Pedagogic Academy 

Cities and towns in Bashkortostan
Birsky Uyezd
Populated places established in 1663
1663 establishments in Russia